El Guapo (Spanish for "The Handsome One") or Guapo may refer to:

Arts and entertainment
 El Guapo (band), later Supersystem, an American band
 Guapo (band), a British art rock band
 El Guapo, a Marvel Comics character in the superhero team X-Statix
 El Guapo, a fictional character in the 1986 film Three Amigos
El Guapo, gaming alias of the young Sylvester Dodd in Scorpion (TV series). First mentioned in season 1, episode 13 - “Kill Screen.”

Nickname or stage name 
 Rich Garcés (born 1971), American baseball pitcher
 David Guapo, David Callejón (born 1981), Spanish comedian and singer
 Bas Rutten (born 1965), Dutch-American actor and MMA fighter

Places
 El Guapo, Miranda, Venezuela
 Guapo River, Venezuela
 Guapo, a village in Point Fortin, Trinidad and Tobago